Gugino is a surname. Notable people with the surname include:

 Carl F. Gugino, American orthodontist 
 Carla Gugino (born 1971), American actress
 Tony Gugino (born 1986), American basketball player